South Brisbane is an inner southern suburb in the City of Brisbane, Queensland, Australia. Being one of the older parts of Brisbane and an area of greater cultural Heritage, South Brisbane has many heritage-listed buildings:

 Outside 39 Annerley Road: former City Electric Light junction box

 Outside 39 Annerley Road: Drinking fountain

 79 Boundary Street: former Tristam's Soft Drink Factory
 36 Browning Street: St George's Greek Orthodox Church
 45 Browning Street: Watson Terrace

 17 Cordelia Street: former Jolly & Batchelor Premises

 91 Cordelia Street: former Musgrave Park & South Brisbane Bowls Club
 38 Dorchester Street: Coorooman (Grange House)

 40 Dorchester Street: Selwyn
 15 Edmondstone Street: Ventnor Flats

 16 Edmondstone Street: Expo 88 Skyneedle, sculpture

 19 Edmondstone Street: Brighton & Kemptown

 23 Edmondstone Street: Staigersleigh

 25 Edmondstone Street: The Quinta
 37 Edmondstone Street: Zapeoin

 43 Edmondstone Street: Sorrento

 72 Ernest Street: St Clement's Melkite Catholic Church & Presbytery
 Fish Lane: Fish Lane
 31 Glenelg Street: former Park Presbyterian Church
 95 Gloucester Street: Nechoma Court
 Grey Street: William Jolly Bridge
 Grey Street: Queensland Cultural Centre
 87 Grey Street: former Commonwealth Bank of Australia
 133 Grey Street: South Brisbane railway station
 271 Grey Street: Collins Place
 3 Hampstead Road: Carmel Court

 3 Lanfear Street: former Foggitt & Jones Factory
 16 Manning Street: former Catholic Apostolic Church
 39 Melbourne Street: former Queensland National Bank

 71 Melbourne Street: Hotel Terminus

 105 Melbourne Street: Merivale

 107 Melbourne Street: Corio

 137 Melbourne Street: former Ariba

 139 Melbourne Street: Warnilla

 141 Melbourne Street: Tyrian

 143 Melbourne Street: Ambeena & Maroomba

 164 Melbourne Street: former Bond's Sweet Factory

 190 Melbourne Street: former Malouf's Fruit Shop & Residence
 20 Merivale Street: St Mary's Catholic Church
 88 Merivale Street: Brisbane South Girls and Infants School
 112 Merivale Street: Brisbane State High School
 53 Mollison Street: former Rosenberg's Hairdressing Salon
 46 Montague Road: Coronation Hotel
 Outside 61 Montague Road: Fire hydrant

 62 Montague Road: Pauls Ice Cream & Milk Office

 99 Montague Road: former Stewart & Lloyds Factory

 133 Montague Road: Substation No. 58
 4 Norfolk Road: Bulwer Cottage

 10 Norfolk Road: Ailsa Craig

 11 Norfolk Road: Dockorie

 12 Norfolk Road: Pickwick

 13 Norfolk Road: Suburban house

 16 Norfolk Road: Wendouree
 South Bank Parklands: Allgas Building
 South Bank Parklands: Byanda
 South Bank Parklands: Nepal Peace Pagoda
 South Bank Parklands: Plough Inn
 74 Stanley Street: Victoria Bridge Abutment
 412 Stanley Street: South Brisbane Dry Dock
 412 Stanley Street: South Brisbane Railway Easement
 459 Stanley Street: South Brisbane Memorial Park
 472 Stanley Street: former South Brisbane Library
 496 Stanley Street: former Bank of New South Wales

 537 Stanley Street: Mater Misericordiae Hospital

 582 Stanley Street: Shop
 82 Stephens Road: St Laurence's College

 95 Stephens Road: Glenwood Cottage
 118 Vulture Street: Tolarno
 152 Vulture Street: former South Brisbane Primary School
 160 Vulture Street: St Andrew's Anglican Church
 176 & 178 Vulture Street: pair of worker's cottages

 180 Vulture Street: Terrace house
 186 Vulture Street: Shop
 240 Vulture Street: San Remo

 215 Vulture Street: Irving Villas & Clyde Villa

 245 Vulture Street: former South Brisbane Congregational Church

 247 Vulture Street: Royal Queensland Society of Blind Citizens Building
 253 Vulture Street (Somerville House): Cumbooquepa
 263 Vulture Street: former South Brisbane Town Hall
 447 Stanley Street: Ship Inn

In addition, the Richard Randall Art Studio used to be located in South Brisbane, but it was relocated to Toowong in 2007.

References

South Brisbane
Heritage of South Brisbane
Heritage